Miloslavsky District is an administrative and municipal district (raion), one of the twenty-five in Ryazan Oblast, Russia. It is located in the southwest of the oblast. Its administrative center is the urban locality (a work settlement) of Miloslavskoye. Population: 13,455 (2010 Census);  The population of Miloslavskoye accounts for 33.3% of the district's total population.

Notable residents 

Vasily Alekseyev (1942–2011), Soviet Olympic weightlifter, born in Pokrovo-Shishkino

References

Notes

Sources

Districts of Ryazan Oblast